High School USA! is an American adult animated television series produced by Friends Night and Animation Domination High-Def Studios. The series was created and written by Dino Stamatopoulos. Nick Weidenfeld, Hend Baghdady and Stamatopoulos executive produce the series.

Plot
The show is about the millennial high-school experience, following a clique of sunny, well-meaning students consisting of Marsh Merriwether, Amber Lamber, Cassandra Barren, Brad Slovee, and Lamort Blackstein.

The art style and basic character setup are a parody of Archie Comics.

Cast

Episodes

References

External links
 

2013 American television series debuts
2015 American television series endings
2010s American adult animated television series
2010s American animated comedy television series
2010s American high school television series
2010s American satirical television series
2010s American teen sitcoms
American adult animated comedy television series
American animated sitcoms
American flash adult animated television series
English-language television shows
Fox Broadcasting Company original programming
Television series by 20th Century Fox Television
Television series by Fox Television Animation
Teen animated television series